Seizures is the third and final studio album by Australian rock band Kisschasy, released through Below Par Records on 21 August 2009. The album was recorded in Los Angeles with producer Rob Schnapf.

Writing process
All the songs were written by singer and guitarist Darren Cordeux. "I set up a home studio in Feb 08 and basically wrote for a year straight. It was a bit of a down year for me so I decided to make a record about life as a 23 year-old. It's more honest and raw than I've ever been - where Hymns looked to a lot of outside sources for inspiration, this record is a lot more introspective - which is scary as hell! I got ripped off, pissed off, watched a lot of TV, drank myself into a stupor consistently and had a great time doing it. These are some of the things you can expect to hear on this record." He said that he got the idea for the name "Seizures" while reading. "I was reading a book by Dr Oliver Sacks called 'The Man Who Mistook His Wife For a Hat' and in one chapter he tells a story about a few patients who were either epileptic or stroke victims and every time they would seizure they'd remember things from their past that had long been forgotten. Some of these memories were quite painful but others were wonderful moments of music or love. The songs on this record are my versions of the seizures those patients experienced - they will always bring me back to a certain time in my life"

Singles and promotion
This album was created by ENG 101-47 at QCC. Hooray! The album's first single, "Generation Why", was released to radio airplay and as a digital download on 7 July 2009. The song's music video was released onto YouTube prior to the single on 24 Jun 2009. It was posted on their MySpace page on the same day as the video was posted and released as a CD single on 3 July 2009. The song is said to be about "armchair philosophers who love to complain," according to songwriter Darren Cordeux, who also said, "The title kind of came after the song was written so its not exactly specific to 'my generation' but I do spend the most time with people around my own age so I guess it could be taken that way".

The album's second single, "Turnaround", was released to radio airplay and as a digital download in September 2009.  The video was filmed at Darlinghurst Community Centre, Sydney and features a preacher-like person trying to sell snakeoil cures to the audience.

On 14 January 2010 it was announced on the band's website that the third single off the album would be "Dinosaur". The music video for premiered on the 11th of February on the Nova website. The video featured two animated dinosaurs. The video was created by Swinburne University student, Chris Scott Baker, who won the competition run by the band for Australian film animation students.

Track listing

Personnel

Band
 Joel Vanderuit – bass
 Karl Ammitzboll – drums, percussion
 Sean Thomas – guitar
 Darren Cordeux – lead vocals, guitar

Additional musicians
 Rob Schnapf – additional keys, guitars and vocals
 The Steel Train Choir – gang vocals on "Turnaround"

Production
 Rob Schnapf – producer, mixing engineer
 Doug Boehm – mixing engineer, audio engineer
 Zack Carper  – additional engineering, assistant at Mant Studios
 Alan Yoshida – mastering at Oceanway Mastering
 Chris Constable – assistant at Sonora Recorders
 John Oreshnick – drum technician

Artwork
 Simon Ozolins – photography
 Mathematics – art direction, design

Charts

References

General
 
Specific

2009 albums
Kisschasy albums
Albums produced by Rob Schnapf